Eduardo M. Peñalver is an American law professor who is the president of Seattle University. From 2014 until 2021, Peñalver was the 16th dean of Cornell Law School.

Peñalver has served as the President of Seattle University since July 1, 2021, and is a professor of law at the Seattle University School of Law.

Education
Peñalver earned his B.A. from Cornell University and M.A. from Oriel College, Oxford, where he was a Rhodes Scholar. He then received his J.D. from Yale Law School. Peñalver also clerked for Judge Guido Calabresi of the United States Court of Appeals for the Second Circuit, and Justice John Paul Stevens of the U.S. Supreme Court.

Career
From 2014 until 2021, Peñalver was the Allan R. Tessler Dean of Cornell Law School taking over for Stewart J. Schwab. He is an expert on property and land use law as well as the intersection of law and religion. His scholarship has appeared in law reviews such as the Yale Law Journal Columbia Law Review and Cornell Law Review. He has authored, co-authored or edited five books on property including Property Outlaws, examining the role of disobedience in the development of property law, and  An Introduction to Property Theory.

Peñalver began his academic career at Fordham Law School from 2003-2006 before moving on to Cornell Law School from 2006-2012 and was a visiting professor at both Harvard Law School and Yale Law School. He then served as the John P. Wilson Professor of Law at the University of Chicago Law School from 2012 to 2014 before being named the 16th dean of Cornell Law School. Peñalver is the first person of Latino descent to become dean of an Ivy League law school.

Publications

Books authored

Selected scholarly publications
Exactions Creep, 2013 S. Ct. Rev. 287 (2014)(with Lee Fennell)
The Right Not to Use in Patent and Property Law, 98 Cornell L. Rev. 1437 (2013) (with Oskar Liivak)
The Illusory Right to Abandon, 109 Mich. L. Rev. 191 (2010)
Regulatory Taxings, 105 Colum. L. Rev. 2182 (2004)

Selected opinion writing
"The Obscure Case That Could Blow Up American Civil-Rights and Consumer-Protection Laws", The Atlantic, March 25, 2021 https://www.theatlantic.com/ideas/archive/2021/03/cedar-point-scotus/618405/
"Remembering Justice Ginsburg", Cornell Chronicle, Sept. 2020, https://news.cornell.edu/stories/2020/09/penalver-justice-justice-shall-you-pursue-remembering-justice-ruth-bader-ginsburg

See also 
 List of law clerks of the Supreme Court of the United States (Seat 4)

References

External links 
 Cornell Law School Faculty Profile

Year of birth missing (living people)
Living people
Cornell University alumni
Yale Law School alumni
Cornell Law School faculty
Presidents of Seattle University
Seattle University faculty
American legal scholars
Law clerks of the Supreme Court of the United States
Deans of law schools in the United States